Abiskoa is a monotypic genus of dwarf spiders containing the single species, Abiskoa abiskoensis. It was first described by Michael I. Saaristo & A. V. Tanasevitch in 2000, and has only been found in Europe, East Asia, and China.

See also
 List of Linyphiidae species

References

Linyphiidae
Monotypic Araneomorphae genera
Spiders of Asia
Taxa named by Michael Saaristo